The Center for Study of Gene Structure and Function (Gene Center) is a consortium of fifty-three researchers (twelve from minority groups underrepresented in the sciences). It is based at Hunter College in Manhattan. It focuses on cross-disciplinary and translational research by promoting dialogue and cooperation among scientists working in diverse biomedical research fields. It is funded by the Research Centers in Minority Institutions (RCMI) program of the National Center for Research Resources(NCRR) of the National Institute of Health (NIH)  Since its establishment in 1985, the NIH has awarded the Gene Center over $38 million in federal grants. 

The Gene Center participates in two primary collaboratory networks: Clinical and Translational Science Center (CTSC)  and the RCMI Translational Research Network. The CTSC comprises New York City's Weill Cornell Medical College, Memorial Sloan-Kettering Cancer Center, Hospital for Special Surgery, and the Hunter-Bellevue School of Nursing.  The CTSC builds collaborations between the partner institutions and community organizations to accelerate research from the laboratory into patient care, and to improve health outcomes in the community.  The partnership was launched in September 2007 with a $49 million award from the National Institutes of Health (NIH).  The RTRN is a coalition of 18 RCMI Programs across the United States. This network integrates clinical, biomedical, and behavioral researchers with health care providers and community leaders into geographically and ethnically diverse research partnerships aimed at improving patient outcomes in areas identified as national public health priorities. 

The Gene Center also sponsors seminars, colloquia, and annual symposia and funds student researchers at the undergraduate, graduate and postdoctoral levels. This support includes translational research opportunities. These students, many of whom are minorities from national and international colleges and universities, have advanced to academic and professional appointments at institutions such as Hunter College, CUNY, George Washington University, Harvard, Johns Hopkins University, Albert Einstein College of Medicine, the Cancer Institute at Mount Sinai Hospital and National Institutes of Health.

History 
The Gene Center was founded in 1985 after the RCMI program was established by a Federal Mandate.  The Congressional legislation was sponsored by Congressmen Louis Stokes and William Natcher. The Gene Center receives RCMI grant funds targeted for "enhancing the research capacity and infrastructure at minority colleges and universities that offer doctorates in health sciences."  Because many investigators at RCMI institutions study diseases that disproportionately affect minorities, the program serves the dual purpose of bringing more minority scientists into mainstream research and enhancing studies of minority health.  CUNY established the Center as an institute in 1988 to unite the efforts of CUNY chemists, biologists, and psychologists researching biomolecular structure, interactions and their effects on gene function.

The current Program Director is Dr. Robert Dottin.

Mission and goals 
Mission:
To develop and prepare the next generation of American scientists, including minorities under-represented in the sciences
To recruit and equip outstanding faculty, including minorities
To develop shared core research facilities
To implement strategies for scientific networking
To build unique collaborations among biologists, chemists, biopsychologists, biophysicists, bioanthropologists and clinicians
To transform basic research discoveries into clinical applications

Goals:
Continue to increase and diversify the research faculty with emphasis on:
Recruitment of faculty historically underrepresented in the sciences
Mentoring of junior faculty to increase their competitiveness in acquiring extramural support and enhancing their visibility as researchers
Improve the research environment by increasing the contributions of postdoctoral fellows and graduate students in the research enterprise
Sponsor complementary activities, such as colloquia, workshops and symposia
Strengthen the research infrastructure
Encourage  and support students pursuing graduate study in biomedical research
Participate in Translational Research with the Clinical Translational Science Center and with the RCMI Translational Research Network

Awards and recognitions 
The Gene Center and its members are widely acknowledged for their research and contributions to the scientific field.

Members research areas and facilities 
The fifty-three Gene Center researchers are also faculty members at Hunter College in the departments of Biology, Chemistry, Physics, Psychology, Anthropology, Urban Health and Social Work, and Mathematics and Statistics. 
The research fields of Gene Center members are: 
Bioinformatics
Gene Expression and Signal Transduction
Biomolecular Theory and Computer Graphics
Nanotechnology
Drug Design and Synthesis
Molecular Immunology
Cancer Research
Neurobiology
Biopsychology
Drug and Protein Interaction with Nucleic Acids

There are 7 basic science and translational core research facilities available to Gene Center members and their collaborators and to the CUNY community: 
X-ray Diffraction
Nuclear Magnetic Resonance
Bioimaging
Network
Animal Care
Flow Cytometry
Internet2 Video-Conferencing

Research programs 
Hunter College offers several undergraduate, graduate, and postdoctoral research programs and fellowships. These programs give students access to the Gene Center's research laboratories and the resources of their mentors, collaborators and peers.

Events

Networking 
Justgarciahill (JGH) is a virtual community for minorities in sciences committed to increasing the number of minorities entering science careers and to celebrating contributions to science by minority scientists.  JGH strives to provide a supportive on-line environment that stimulates underrepresented minorities to pursue careers in science.  The scientific content promotes the health of minority populations and addresses health disparity issues.

References 

Research institutes established in 1985
Hunter College
1985 establishments in New York City
City University of New York research institutes